Mahbubul Karim (born 10 May 1986) is a former Bangladeshi cricketer. He is also known as Mahbub-ul-Karim and sometime referred to on scoresheets by the name Mithu. He was born in Chittagong in 1986.

A specialist batsman, he made his debut for Chittagong Division in 2003/04 and played through the 2017/18 season, playing in a total of 43 first-class and 51 list A matches. He played in eight Indian Cricket League matches for Dhaka Warriors in 2008.

References

1986 births
Bangladeshi cricketers
Chittagong Division cricketers
Living people
Kala Bagan Krira Chakra cricketers
Victoria Sporting Club cricketers
Sheikh Jamal Dhanmondi Club cricketers
ICL Bangladesh XI cricketers
Dhaka Warriors cricketers
People from Chittagong